Louis VIII of Bavaria (German: Ludwig VIII der Höckrige, Louis the Hunchback) (1 September 1403 – 7 April 1445) was Duke of Bavaria-Ingolstadt from 1443 until his death. He was born in Paris, a son of Louis VII and his first wife Anne de Bourbon-La Marche, a daughter of John I, Count of La Marche. He died in 1445 at Ingolstadt.

Biography
He married Margarete of Brandenburg (1410 - July 27, 1465), daughter of Frederick I of Brandenburg, on July 20, 1441.  Since 1438 Louis had been feuding with his father Louis VII, who gave undue preference to another (illegitimate) son. Louis allied with Henry XVI of Bavaria-Landshut against his father, who was finally taken prisoner in 1443, but Louis VIII died two years later. When Louis VII also died in 1447, Henry finally succeeded in Bavaria-Ingolstadt.

Louis VIII of Bavaria-Landshut
Louis VIII of Bavaria-Landshut
15th-century dukes of Bavaria
Louis VIII of Bavaria-Landshut
Louis VIII of Bavaria-Landshut